Oliver Fink (born 6 June 1982) is German former footballer.

Personal life
He is the older brother of fellow footballer Tobias Fink.

Career statistics

1.Includes Promotion playoff.

References

External links
 

Living people
1982 births
German footballers
Association football midfielders
Fortuna Düsseldorf players
SSV Jahn Regensburg players
SSV Jahn Regensburg II players
SV Wacker Burghausen players
SpVgg Unterhaching players
Fortuna Düsseldorf II players
Bundesliga players
2. Bundesliga players
3. Liga players
Regionalliga players